Terry McAuliffe is an Anglican priest, and a former Archdeacon of Forrest then Stirling, WA in the Anglican Diocese of Perth. In 2014 he sued the Perth Archbishop Roger Herft for defamation, saying his reputation was damaged by Herft in what led to his removal from his position as the Archdeacon of Stirling in March 2011.

References

Edith Cowan University alumni
21st-century Anglican priests
Archdeacons of Stirling, WA
Archdeacons of Forrest
Living people
Year of birth missing (living people)